Kernel normal form, or KNF, is the coding style used in the development of code for the BSD operating systems. Based on the original KNF concept from the Computer Systems Research Group, it dictates a programming style to which contributed code should adhere prior to its inclusion into the codebase. KNF started out as a codification of how Ken Thompson and Dennis Ritchie formatted the original UNIX C source code. It describes such things as how to name variables, use indents and the use of ANSI C or K&R C code styles. Each BSD variant has its own KNF rules, which have evolved over time to differ from each other in small ways.

The SunOS kernel and userland also uses a similar indentation style that was derived from AT&T style documents and that is sometimes known as Bill Joy Normal Form. The correctness of the indentation of a list of source files can be verified by a style checker program written by Bill Shannon. This style checker program is called cstyle.

See also 
 Programming style
 Indent style

References

External links 

 
 

Berkeley Software Distribution
Source code